Kyle Miller may refer to:

Kyle Miller (footballer) (born 1992), Scottish footballer
Kyle Miller (Counter-Strike player) (born 1984), American Counter-strike player
Kyle Miller (American football) (born 1988), American football tight end
Kyle Miller (lacrosse) (1981–2013), Canadian lacrosse player
Kyle Miller (soccer) (born 1989), American soccer player
Kyle Miller (golfer) (born 1990), Canadian golfer